Megacraspedus niphorrhoa is a moth of the family Gelechiidae. It is found in Russia (southern Ural) and Kazakhstan (Uralsk).

There are two longitudinal yellowish lines on the forewings. The hindwings are pale fuscous and slightly glossy.

References

Moths described in 1926
Megacraspedus